Glissandro 70 was a Canadian Afrobeat band based in Toronto, Ontario. Its members are Craig Dunsmuir  ( Kanada 70, Guitarkestra) and Sandro Perri (a.k.a. Polmpo Polpo), who play an blend of dance and experimental rock styles.

History
Dunsmuir and Perri began by creating music for an audio weblog.  They continued to collaborate intermittently over a period of three years, beginning in 2004, and  released their self-titled five-track debut album on Constellation Records in 2006, to positive reviews. Although the two musicians also play rock music together in another of Perri's bands, the musical style of this project is more dance-oriented. The album appeared on the !earshot campus and community radio charts in April that year.

Glissandro 70 also contributed a track, "Voices Are Your Best Friend", to the children's compilation album See You on the Moon!, released  by Paper Bag Records.

Discography
 Glissandro 70 (2006)

References

External links
 Glissandro 70
 Glissandro 70 at Constellation Records

Musical groups with year of establishment missing
Musical groups from Toronto
Canadian post-rock groups
Constellation Records (Canada) artists